City Hall Plaza in Boston, Massachusetts, is a large, open, public space in the Government Center area of the city. The architectural firm Kallmann McKinnell & Knowles designed the plaza in 1962 to accompany Boston's new City Hall building. The multi-level, irregularly shaped plaza consists of red brick and concrete. The Government Center MBTA station is located beneath the plaza; its entrance is at the southwest corner of the plaza.

History 

The siting of the plaza, the City Hall, and other structures in Government Center was the responsibility of I. M. Pei, commissioned by Edward J. Logue, then development administrator of the Boston Redevelopment Authority. The plaza and City Hall were constructed between 1963 and 1968, on the former site of Scollay Square, which despite its vibrancy and historical interest, was considered a seedy area by some. Other streets removed to make way for the plaza included Brattle Street and Cornhill. Two historic buildings formerly on Cornhill, known as the Sears' Crescent and Sears' Block, were not demolished and now face the southern edge of the plaza.

The 1962 design was reportedly modeled after Piazza del Campo in Siena, Italy.

Reaction to the plaza has been mixed. Some praise City Hall Plaza for being cleaner and more appealing than Scollay Square, and for the simple fact that it was built at all—with the cooperation and compromises necessary of any complex, multi-agency government construction project. Architecture critic Ada Louise Huxtable called the plaza "one of the best urban spaces of the 20th century. ...  With the plaza, and specifically because of it, the Boston Government Center can now take its place among the world's great city spaces." The Cultural Landscape Foundation listed the plaza as one of its "Marvels of Modernism."

Others dislike City Hall Plaza for its anti-social aesthetic and failure to address unpleasant weather effects (such as wintertime cold, wet, and wind, and summertime heat, dust, sun, and wind).  The Project for Public Spaces ranked it at the top of the organization's list of "Squares Most Dramatically in Need of Improvement in the United States" in 2005, and has placed the plaza on its "Hall of Shame."

A fountain was built at the northwest corner of the plaza as part of the original design.  But it was shut down in 1977 because water was leaking into the Blue Line subway tunnel below.  The fountain was covered over with a concrete slab in 2006. A nonprofit group built a "Cancer Garden of Hope" at the northeast corner of the plaza in 2010.

Redesign 
Since the plaza opened in 1968, ideas for improvements to the public space have been put forth by citizens, students, architects, politicians, and others. In the early 2000s, cellist Yo-Yo Ma proposed the construction of a music garden based on his Inspired by Bach series of recordings.  The plan did not move forward in Boston, but was realized as the Toronto Music Garden.

Boston Mayor Thomas Menino had several ideas for improvement. In 2007, Emerson College students used the virtual world Second Life to re-imagine a better design. The project was sponsored by the Boston Redevelopment Authority, among others. A 2011 study commissioned by the United States Environmental Protection Agency made recommendations for the "greening" of the plaza.  A 2014 study by three landscape architecture students at West Virginia University proposed a complete redesign of the plaza.

In 2015, the city launched a crowdsourcing project entitled "Re-invent City Hall Plaza," asking the public for suggestions to improve the plaza. Later in the year, the city made a number of changes to the plaza, including installing artificial grass, picnic tables, and lawn chairs, to make the space more inviting.  However, the Project for Public Spaces argued that "these efforts to put what the New York Times has called a 'kelly green band-aid' on this gaping wound in the heart of the city, are insufficient," and that a more comprehensive redesign is needed.  A 2016 plan for a ferris wheel and other improvements to the plaza did not move forward.

Work had begun in 2011 on plans to redesign the plaza and the Government Center MBTA station. The new MBTA station opened in March 2016 after two years of construction. Extensive landscaping and accessibility improvements to the adjacent areas of the plaza were completed in 2017.

A year-long study entitled "Rethink City Hall" was completed in 2017 by the firms Utile and Reed Hilderbrand. The final report called for major changes in City Hall and the plaza.

"The Patios," a seasonal beer garden, opened in 2018 on a terrace overlooking Congress Street, and was expanded for 2019.

In June 2019, the city announced the start of construction of a $70 million project to transform the plaza into a "People's Plaza" that will include "a civic space for all residents, with universal accessibility, new civic spaces for all to use, increased environmental sustainability, and critical infrastructure improvements that will ensure the Plaza is safe and accessible for all for generations to come." The plans, developed by Sasaki Associates, include schematic designs for the project. In January 2020, the Boston Landmarks Commission approved the first phase of the project. Construction began in 2020. Construction reached the half-way point in August 2021.  The work includes adding "3,000 seating spaces, 12,000-square-feet of playscapes for children, and 11,000-square-feet of terraces for interactive public art.  The renovated plaza opened in November 2022.

Public events

Nearby Boston Common has long been used for public events, including a 1969 peace rally that drew an estimated crowd of 100,000 and the 1979 mass celebrated by Pope John Paul II. But damage to the park from such large events led city officials to limit future events on the Common, relocating many to the paved City Hall Plaza.

Annual events held on City Hall Plaza include Boston Calling Music Festival (2013–2016), Big Apple Circus, The Jimmy Fund Scooper Bowl, the Boston Pride Festival, the African Festival of Boston, Boston GreenFest, Boston Techjam, the Puerto Rican Festival of Massachusetts, the finish line of Hub on Wheels, and the Boston Cycling Celebration.

Occasional events on the plaza have included Boston's 350th birthday celebration, art exhibits such as Strandbeest; large rallies in honor of the New England Patriots, the Boston Red Sox, and the Boston Bruins; political demonstrations; an exhibit of "street pianos"; beer festivals; HUBweek, a pizza festival, the Boston Night Market, a "Roller Disco Tribute Party", and the display of a 25-foot-tall statue of King Tut.

The Plaza has also been the site for many free concerts including being the original site (before moving to the Hatch Memorial Shell) for WODS (Oldies 103.3) summer concert series such as Chubby Checker and Paul Revere & the Raiders.

From December 2016 until February 2017, the Plaza opened an outdoor Skating Path and Holiday Market, as part of an installation called "Boston Winter". The skating path provided skating lessons for different age groups and planned themed skating events. Boston Winter continued the following year, but did not return in December 2018 as the city prepared for a major renovation of the plaza.

Image gallery

References

Further reading

Published in the 2010s
 . (Describes plan of New York's Delaware North Companies, Inc. to build commercial ferris wheel, skating rink, eateries, etc.)
 
 
 Andrew Ryan. Maligned for decades, City Hall Plaza to get EPA-aided makeover. Boston Globe. Sep 9, 2010. pg. B.3
 A softer City Hall: Architects offer visions for less-austere City Hall Plaza; Young architects offer visions for turning plaza into something a bit more welcoming Boston Globe.  Apr 4, 2010. pg. G.1

Published in the 2000s
 Peter J. Howe. Mayor has new spin for City Hall Plaza; Menino wants to explore wind turbine installation. Boston Globe, Sep 29, 2007. pg. A.1.
 Christina Pazzanese. Some small things could pretty up City Hall Plaza. Boston Globe, Sep 16, 2007. pg. 2.
 Matt Viser. Fount of futility finally runs dry; City Hall Plaza eyesore gets a concrete solution. Boston Globe, June 9, 2006. pg. B.1.
 Jack Thomas. 'I wanted something that would last': At 89, an architect stands by his plan for City Hall after four decades of both condemnation and praise. Boston Globe. October 13, 2004.
 Talk about City Hall Plaza. Boston Globe, Apr 12, 2003. pg. A.10.
 Thomas C. Palmer Jr. Effort to improve City Hall Plaza gets new life, group expected to deliver recommendations next year. Globe Staff. Boston Globe, Oct 1, 2002. pg. D.1.
 Sarah Schweitzer. An unfulfilled urban promise; Menino resurrects a plan to renovate City Hall Plaza. Boston Globe, Aug 8, 2002. pg. B.1.
 Robert F. Walsh. Some lessons on upkeep at City Hall Plaza. Boston Globe, Apr 15, 2002. pg. A.17.
 Improving City Hall Plaza. Boston Globe, Jul 17, 2000. pg. A.10.

Published in the 1990s
 Anthony Flint. City Hall Plaza to get $27.5M renovation. Boston Globe, Dec 17, 1999. pg. B.3.
 A refuge on City Hall Plaza. Boston Globe, Dec 17, 1999. pg. A.26.
 Anthony Flint. City Hall Plaza redesign is OK'd; modest makeover to be announced. Boston Globe. Boston, Mass.: Dec 15, 1999. pg. A.38.

Published in the 1960s
 Walter Muir Whitehill. Boston: a topographical history, 2nd ed. Cambridge, MA: Harvard University Press, 1968.

External links

 City of Boston web page about plaza renovations
 Facebook page
 Twitter. @concreteplaza. About Government Center MBTA subway station renovation in City Hall Plaza, 2014
Project for Public Spaces
Kallman McKinnell & Wood Architects
 One citizen's hope for the barren wasteland of Boston City Hall Plaza. YouTube, 2007.
 Kevin McCrea exposes Mayor Menino giving away 300 million dollars at City Hall Plaza. YouTube, 2009.
 Urban Toronto. Discussion thread about Boston's City Hall.

Squares in Boston
Buildings and structures completed in 1968
Government Center, Boston
Odonyms referring to a building